Christian Wilhelm Wisbech (7 October 1832 – 5 April 1897) was a Norwegian naval officer and politician for the Conservative Party.

He was born in Bergen as the son of Christian Wisbech (1801–1869) and his wife Alida Georgine Brunchorst (1803–1860). He married Thora Heiberg.

Wisbech was a Captain in the Royal Norwegian Navy. He was also elected to the Norwegian Parliament in 1883 and 1889, representing the constituency of Jarlsberg og Larviks Amt.

He died in 1897 in Horten.

Notes

1832 births
1897 deaths
Members of the Storting
Conservative Party (Norway) politicians
Vestfold politicians
Royal Norwegian Navy personnel